All-New Dennis the Menace is an animated series based on the comic strip by Hank Ketcham. It ran in 1993 on CBS, while the 1986 series was still airing in syndication, capitalizing on the success of a live-action film adaptation of the comic strip that was released the same year. The series was produced by DIC Entertainment and Reteitalia, S.p.A., in association with Spanish network Telecinco. Much like the latter, All-New was sponsored by General Mills.

Cast
Adam Wylie as Dennis Mitchell
Greg Burson as George Wilson
Jeannie Elias as Margaret Wade and Peebee Kappa
June Foray as Martha Wilson
Dan Gilvezan as Henry Mitchell and Ruff
Katie Leigh as Gina Gillotti and Joey McDonald
Anna Mathias as Alice Mitchell

Additional voices

Jack Angel
Allyce Beasley
Bob Bergen
Gregg Berger
Eileen Brennan
Rodger Bumpass
Frank Buxton
Hamilton Camp
Brian Cummings
Jennifer Darling
Linda Gary
Michael Gough
Danny Mann
Mona Marshall
Chuck McCann

Michael Mish
Pat Musick as Chuck Millman
Wayne Powers
Jan Rabson
Hal Rayle
Eugene Roche
Roger Rose
Maggie Roswell
Jack Roth
John Rubinow
Kevin Schon
Roger Scott
Susan Silo
David H. Sterry
Doug Stone

Episodes

Background and production

Music 
The series' opening theme was adapted from the overture to Wolfgang Amadeus Mozart's opera The Marriage of Figaro. The series' score also consists of classical music adaptations from overtures, such as the one from Gioachino Rossini's The Barber of Seville.

Release

United States
Buena Vista Home Video released two single-episode VHS tapes in 1994, featuring the episodes "It's a Guy Thing" and "Hospitality".

Australia
Roadshow Entertainment released several VHS tapes in Australia in the mid-90s.

Magna Pacific released all 13 episodes (except "Pig Out" and "Battle of the Bonding") on three separate region 4 DVD volumes in Australia in 2004,

United Kingdom
Anchor Bay UK released a single DVD volume in June 2004, containing the first four episodes of the series. This DVD was reissued under Anchor Bay's "Price Wise" budget DVD imprint in August 2006.

In June 2005, Avenue Entertainment released two DVD volumes containing two episodes each.

Other media

Dennis the Menace: Cruise Control 
In 2002, DIC produced a Television Film as part of their DIC Movie Toons series, titled Dennis the Menace: Cruise Control. It originally premiered on television on Nickelodeon on October 27, 2002, and was released on VHS and DVD shortly afterward by MGM Home Entertainment, and later aired internationally on Disney Channel and Toon Disney. Instead of duplicating the look and feel of this show, it harked back instead to the character designs from the better-known 1986 Dennis the Menace series, also produced by DIC. It marks the first Dennis the Menace project released after Hank Ketcham's death on June 1, 2001.

References

External links

 
 

1990s American animated television series
1993 American television series debuts
1993 American television series endings
American animated television spin-offs
American children's animated comedy television series
Animated television series about children
CBS original programming
Dennis the Menace (U.S. comics) television series
English-language television shows
Italian children's animated comedy television series
Television series by DIC Entertainment